Old School is a novel by Tobias Wolff, first published on November 4, 2003, after three portions of the novel had appeared in The New Yorker as short stories.

Plot
The book is narrated by a school senior ("sixth former" in prep-school vernacular) at an unnamed elite boarding school in the northeastern United States in 1960–61. The unnamed protagonist is a scholarship student who comes from a middle-class family.

He aspires to be a writer, and the school he attends is an embodiment of a certain kind of academic fantasy, where non-English masters (teachers are "masters" here) "floated at the fringe of [the English masters'] circle, as if warming themselves at a fire," and literature is still believed to hold the key to the soul. Robert Frost, Ayn Rand, and Ernest Hemingway, with each of whom the narrator crosses paths, appear in the story, dispensing wisdom, pseudo-wisdom, vitriol. These literary appearances amount to creative satires of these authors, especially Ayn Rand. The novel revolves around themes of adolescence, class, and the role of literature.

The Penguin Random House publisher's blurb describes the book thus:

In his review for the New York Times, critic A.O. Scott writes that Old School is "about nothing if not the making of a writer — though it is also, just as plainly, about a writer's failure."

Reception
This book was a finalist for the 2004 PEN/Faulkner Award for Fiction.

The review for Old School in the Los Angeles Times noted, "...Wolff again proves himself a writer of the highest order: part storyteller, part philosopher, someone deeply engaged in asking hard questions that take a lifetime to resolve."

The novel was chosen as a National Endowment for the Arts "Big Read" book for communities to read together. The Libraries of Greater Kansas City chose Old School as their Big Read in 2009.

References

External links

 Book available to borrow from Internet Archive (registration required)
 "Class Picture", an edited excerpt from the novel that appeared in the New Yorker in January 2003
 "Tobias Wolff and 'Old School'", an interview with Wolff on NPR's All Things Considered
 Review in the London Review of Books
 Review in The Atlantic

2003 American novels
Novels by Tobias Wolff
Alfred A. Knopf books
Novels set in boarding schools
The Hill School
PEN/Faulkner Award for Fiction-winning works